Table tennis was contested at the 1982 Asian Games in New Delhi, India. Table tennis had team, doubles and singles events for men and women, as well as a mixed doubles competition.

Medalists

Medal table

References

External links
 ITTF Database

 
1982 Asian Games events
1982
Asian Games
1982 Asian Games